Ness Lake is a lake in British Columbia's Northern Interior. The lake has a distinctive shape, as it is divided into three larger "basins" (Southwest, Central and East), which are connected to one another via smaller, narrow portions of lake. The Eastern and Central Basins have the greatest amount of development (including Ness Lake Bible Camp  and a public beach). Meanwhile, the Southwest Basin features a wetland.

References

Lakes of British Columbia
Cariboo Land District